Justas Pažarauskas (born 1991) is a Lithuanian goalball player who competes in international elite competitions. He is a Paralympic champion, World Games champion and European champion.

References 

1991 births
Living people
People from Joniškis
Paralympic goalball players of Lithuania
Goalball players at the 2016 Summer Paralympics
Medalists at the 2016 Summer Paralympics
Date of birth missing (living people)